Rajendra Kumar Poddar is an Indian politician. He was a Member of Parliament, representing Bihar in the Rajya Sabha the upper house of India's Parliament as an Independent.

References

Rajya Sabha members from Bihar
Independent politicians in India
1936 births
Living people